SmithProject was an Open Source CFML script engine. 

The Smith Project was initiated by youngculture AG based on a need to migrate a large ColdFusion based web application to a Java-based engine. 

Other CFML engines include Adobe ColdFusion, New Atlanta BlueDragon, Lucee, Railo, and Coral Web Builder.

See also 
ColdFusion (software)

External links 
 Official Website (currently down)
 SourceForge.com file mirror

CFML compilers
CFML programming language